Nicolás Carlos Colazo (born 8 July 1990 in Buenos Aires), is an Argentine professional footballer who plays as a winger for Primera División club Gimnasia y Esgrima (LP).

Club career

Boca Juniors
At age 9 Colazo joined Boca Juniors, where he played at every youth level. His debut for the first team came on July 4, 2009 against Colón, in a 3–1 Boca victory. His first senior goal came in January 2010, a header in a friendly match against San Lorenzo in Mar del Plata. He scored a goal in the Superclásico against River Plate in January 2011. After the arrival of Julio César Falcioni as head coach for the 2011 Torneo Clausura, Colazo earned a starting role in the Boca squad for the first time.

Loans
In 2013, he was sent on loan to All Boys. Colazo scored one goal for the club, coming in a 1–0 victory over Estudiantes de la Plata in the Copa Argentina quarterfinals.

On 20 September 2016, Colazo joined Melbourne City on a one-year loan deal as the club's second marquee signing. Colazo assisted a Bruno Fornaroli goal on his debut, as City picked up a 4–1 win in the Melbourne Derby against Melbourne Victory FC. Colazo returned to Boca Juniors after Melbourne City lost their elimination-final against Perth Glory.

On 5 July 2018, Colazo joined Superleague Greece side Aris on a one-year loan deal. On 24 January 2019, he left Aris and joined Tigre on a 6-month loan deal. The 28-year-old player scored six goals at 25 championship performances with the shirt of Club de Gimnasia y Esgrima La Plata during 2017-18 season, on loan from Boca Juniors.

Honours
Boca Juniors
 Primera División: 2011, 2015
 Copa Argentina: 2011–12, 2014–15

Melbourne City
 FFA Cup: 2016

References

External links
 
 
 Colazo, Nicolás Carlos at Historia de Boca.com 

Living people
1990 births
Argentine footballers
Argentine expatriate footballers
Footballers from Buenos Aires
Association football forwards
Boca Juniors footballers
Club de Gimnasia y Esgrima La Plata footballers
Melbourne City FC players
Aris Thessaloniki F.C. players
All Boys footballers
Club Atlético Tigre footballers
Rosario Central footballers
C.A. Rentistas players
Argentine Primera División players
Uruguayan Primera División players
A-League Men players
Marquee players (A-League Men)
Argentine expatriate sportspeople in Greece
Argentine expatriate sportspeople in Australia
Argentine expatriate sportspeople in Uruguay
Expatriate footballers in Greece
Expatriate soccer players in Australia
Expatriate footballers in Uruguay
Argentine people of Italian descent